Poliosia albida is a moth in the family Erebidae. It was described by George Hampson in 1914. It is found in the Gambia and Uganda.

References

Moths described in 1914
Lithosiina